Tone Dečman (26 June 1913 – 1989) was a Slovenian skier. He competed in the Nordic combined event at the 1936 Winter Olympics.

References

External links
 

1913 births
1989 deaths
Slovenian male Nordic combined skiers
Olympic Nordic combined skiers of Yugoslavia
Nordic combined skiers at the 1936 Winter Olympics
Skiers from Ljubljana